The Hunter 18.5 is an American trailerable sailboat that was designed by the Hunter Design Team as a cruising sailboat and first built in 1987.

Production
The design was built by Hunter Marine in the United States between 1987 and 1993, but it is now out of production.

Design
The Hunter 18.5 is a small recreational keelboat, built predominantly of fiberglass, with wood trim. It has a fractional sloop rig with a fully battened mainsail, a raked stem, a reverse transom, a transom-hung kick-up rudder controlled by a tiller and a fixed wing keel. It displaces  and carries  of ballast.

The boat is optionally fitted with a small  outboard motor for docking and maneuvering. Other factory optional equipment included a portable head, galley alcohol stove, water pump tap, cooler and anchor.

The design has sleeping accommodation for three people, with a double "V"-berth in the bow cabin and a straight settee in the main cabin on the port side.

The design has a PHRF racing average handicap of 288.

Operational history
In a 2010 review Steve Henkel wrote, "in the late 1980s, Hunter Marine expanded their cruising, boat line into smaller sizes. They also redesigned the line with a more 'modern' look. The Hunter 18.5 was one of the first of Hunter's minicruisers to be introduced. Unique features include a very shallow (two-foot draft) keel with both a bulb and 'winglets.' Best features: Headroom of four feet is exceptional for a boat of this size ... Ballast is also highest for the group ... Worst features: The keel is too shallow, and has too small a lateral area, to expect even so-so upwind sailing performance, with or without the winglets (which we suspect are too small to serve any real purpose). The full-length battens make it difficult to 'read' the trim of the mainsail, The flip-up rudder, being deeper than the keel, is thus unprotected and therefore subject to damage or loss if a sudden shoal water situation is encountered and the flip-up mechanism isn't ready for it."

See also
List of sailing boat types

Similar sailboats
Alacrity 19
Buccaneer 200
Cal 20
Catalina 18
Drascombe Lugger
Edel 540
Mistral T-21
Naiad 18
Paceship 20
Sandpiper 565
Sanibel 18
San Juan 21
Siren 17
Typhoon 18

References

External links
Official brochure

Keelboats
1980s sailboat type designs
Sailing yachts
Trailer sailers
Sailboat type designs by Hunter Design Team
Sailboat types built by Hunter Marine